Nigilgia venerea is a moth in the family Brachodidae. It was described by Edward Meyrick in 1921. It is found on Java, Sumatra, Sulawesi and northern Borneo.

References

Brachodidae
Moths described in 1921